Lenawee Christian School is a private Christian school located at 111 Wolf Creek Highway in Adrian, Michigan. It serves 585 students in pre-kindergarten through 12th grade. The student-teacher ratio of the school was 13.18 for the 2009–2010 school year. The current Head of School is Tom Durbin.

Notable alumni
 Kaleb Stewart, musician (1993)
 Rick Baxter, Michigan businessman and politician (1997)
 London Elise Moore, Actress (2011)

Michigan High School Athletic Association State Championships
 Girls Volleyball: 1996, 2003, 2004
 Boys Soccer: 2020
 Boys Football: 2020, 2021

References 

Christian schools in Michigan
Educational institutions established in 1977
Private schools in Michigan
Schools in Lenawee County, Michigan
1977 establishments in Michigan